Monroe Central Junior-Senior High School is a public high school located in Parker City, Indiana.

Athletics
Monroe Central Junior-Senior High school's athletic teams are known as the Golden Bears and compete in the Mid-Eastern Conference. The school offers a wide range of athletics including:
 Football 
 Baseball
 Basketball (Men's and Women's)
 Cheerleading
 Cross country (Men's and Women's)
 Golf (Men's and Women's)
 Track and field (Men's and Women's)
 Softball
 Volleyball
 Wrestling

Football 
Head Coach: John Hochstetler "Coach Ho"

The first official varsity football game played for the Golden Bears was a sectional playoff game against the Tri Titans on October 23rd, 2009. The 2015-2016 Golden Bears football team went 9-3 and made it to the sectional finals for the first time in school history. Additionally, three players received honorable mention by the AP. In 2016-2017 the Golden Bears went 11-1 undefeated in the regular season for their first time making it to the sectional finals for the second time in school history. In 2017–2018 season the Golden Bears went 12-2 (School Record) which resulted in their first regional and sectional titles. 2018-2019 saw the Golden Bears go 10-3 and repeat as sectional champions. The 2020-2021(Covid Season) Golden Bears saw their first MEC conference championship which led to a 7-2 record having lost once in regular season and in the sectional final to the eventual State Runner Ups South Adams Starfires. The 2021-2022 season saw another undefeated season and MEC championship but a loss in the sectional championship called the "Mud Bowl" featured on ESPN final score was 6-3 in favor of the South Adams Starfires.
The Golden Bears Football Team currently has 12 IFCA All-State Players.

See also
 List of high schools in Indiana

References

External links
 Official Website

Buildings and structures in Randolph County, Indiana
Schools in Randolph County, Indiana
Public middle schools in Indiana
Public high schools in Indiana